Louis Pasteur (1822–1895) was a French chemist and microbiologist.

Pasteur may also refer to:

Places
 Pasteur Island, an Antarctic island
 Pasteur Peninsula, an Antarctic peninsula
 Pasteur River (Quebec), a tributary of the Aux Rochers River in Quebec, Canada
 Pasteur, a tributary of the Crișul Repede in Oradea, Romania
 Pasteur Street, a street in Tehran, Iran

Astronomical
 Pasteur (lunar crater)
 Pasteur (Martian crater)
 4804 Pasteur, a main-belt asteroid

Stations
 Pasteur - AMIA (Buenos Aires Underground), Argentina
 Pasteur (Paris Métro), France
 Pasteur (Milan Metro), Italy

Other uses
 Pasteur (name)
 Pasteur (film), a 1935 French film starring Sacha Guitry
 MV Pasteur, a coaster that sank in 1971
 SS Pasteur, a French ocean liner launched in 1938
 Pasteur Institute, a French non-profit private foundation
 Pasteur Institute of Iran, a medical research institute
 Musée Pasteur, a museum in Paris, France
 Louis Pasteur University, a former university in Strasbourg, France
 Îlot Pasteur, a building in Monaco

See also 
 List of things named after Louis Pasteur
 Pasteur effect
 Pasteur pipette
 Pasteur point, level of oxygen
 Pasteurization